Esporte Clube Uruguaiana, commonly known as Uruguaiana, is a Brazilian football club based in Uruguaiana, Rio Grande do Sul state.

History
The club was founded on May 19, 1912. They finished in the second place in the Campeonato Gaúcho Second Level in 1966, losing the competition to Passo Fundo-based club Gaúcho.

Stadium
Esporte Clube Uruguaiana play their home games at Estádio Felisberto Fagundes Filho. The stadium has a maximum capacity of 4,000 people.

References

Association football clubs established in 1912
Football clubs in Rio Grande do Sul
1912 establishments in Brazil